Sara Hall (née Bei; born April 15, 1983) is a professional American distance runner. She won the 3000 meter steeplechase at the 2011 Pan American Games in Guadalajara, Mexico representing the United States. Hall’s personal best time for the marathon is 2:20:32 set at the Marathon Project in Chandler, Arizona on December 22, 2020, making her the third-fastest American woman in history. She is the second-fastest American woman to ever run the half marathon, running 1:07:15 on January 16, 2022–an American record at the time.

Hall has won several notable mile road races including the Drake Relays Grand Blue Mile and the US National Road Mile Championships. She also has won prestigious 1500 meter titles including one at the Millrose Games. She is a two time world team member for the United States at the world indoor track and field championships. Her best finish came in 2006 where she finished 12th in the finals of the 3000 meters at the 11th IAAF World Indoor championships. She was also a member of the 2006 and 2015 United States world cross country championship team.

Hall won the 2012 American title at the USA Cross Country Championships, edging Molly Huddle at the line.

Early life and high school 
Hall was born in Santa Rosa, California and competed for Montgomery High School, winning four state cross country titles.  At the CIF California State Meet she also earned three state track titles in the 1600 and 3200 meters, and won the Footlocker National High School Cross Country Championships in 2000.

College 
Hall was a three-time NCAA track and field runner up in the 5000 meters and indoor 3000 meters, and a 7-time All-American, competing for Stanford University. In 2003, she finished 3rd at the NCAA Women's Cross Country Championship, leading Stanford to a team title. As a college athlete she competed in the finals of the United States Olympic trials in the 5000 meters.

Career
2015
On March 15, 2015 Hall made her marathon debut at the Los Angeles Marathon and battled through cramps, finishing 22nd with a time of 2:48:02 (6:25 minutes/mile).

On March 28, 2015, Hall led the USA Team with a 20th place 2015 IAAF World Cross Country Championships – Senior women's race after placing 5th at the 2015 USA Cross Country Championships in Boulder.

Hall finished 10th at 2015 Chicago marathon in 2:31:14, running an Olympic Standard time.
2016
Hall improved her marathon best with 2:30:06 on April 24, 2016, finishing 12th at the 2016 London Marathon.
2017
On February 26, 2017, Hall again improved her marathon best with a 2:28:26 sixth place performance at the 2017 Tokyo Marathon.

On October 1, 2017, Hall won the Women's US 10 mile road championship in the Twin Cities, in 53:43, 2 seconds ahead of Natosha Rogers. She narrowly lost the equalizer competition male winner Shadrack Kipchirchir, but later it was discovered the women were supposed to be given a 6:18 lead, while they were actually given 6:10, so both runners were give the $10,000.

On October 29, 2017, Hall again improved her marathon best with a 2:27:21 fifth place performance at the 2017 Mainova Frankfurt Marathon.

On December 3, 2017, Hall won the Women's U.S. Marathon in California at 2017 California International Marathon in 2:28:10.
2018
On May 27, Hall was third in the 2018 Ottawa Marathon in 2:26:19.

In July 2018, she placed 3rd at Women's US 10 km road championship at the Peachtree 10K in 32:41.

On September 3, 2018, she won the Women's US 20 km road championship at Faxon Law New Haven Road Race 20 km in New Haven, Connecticut in 1:09:04.

On October 7, 2018, Hall won the Women's US 10 mile road championship in the Twin Cities, in 52:47, repeating her 2017 victory and edging out Molly Huddle by 1 second.
2019
On September 29, 2019, Hall finished fifth in the Berlin Marathon, finishing in a personal best time of 2:22:16.

Just one week later, on October 6, 2019, she won the USATF 10 mile championships for the third time in a row in a time of 53:11.
2020
On October 4, 2020, Hall finished 2nd in 2:22:01 at the 2020 London Marathon behind Brigid Kosgei.

On December 20, 2020, Hall finished first at the Marathon Project in a personal best 2:20:32 in Chandler, Arizona, running with male pacers with the goal of breaking the US record, missing Deena Kastor's 2:19:36 record by just under one minute.
2021
On October 10, 2021, Hall finished third at the Chicago Marathon with a time of 2:27:19.
2022
On January 16, 2022, Hall broke the American record in the half marathon at the Houston Half Marathon, finishing in 1:07:15 to lower the previous American record set by Molly Huddle in 2018 by ten seconds. New record was set by Emily Sisson finishing in 1:07:11 on 7 May 2022 on USATF.  

On March 6, 2022, Hall finished eighth at the Tokyo Marathon with a time of 2:22:56.

On July 18, 2022, Hall finished fifth at 2022 World Athletics Championships in the marathon with a time of 2:22:10.

Personal life
Hall has been married to U.S. Olympic marathoner Ryan Hall since 2005. The two met at Stanford, where they both competed collegiately. In 2009, they formed the Hall Steps Foundation to empower the running community to use the energy and resources that fuel runners' athletic achievements for social justice efforts. Both are committed Christians. The couple adopted four sisters in 2015.

References

External links

 official website
 
 

1983 births
Living people
Sportspeople from Santa Rosa, California
Track and field athletes from California
American female middle-distance runners
American female long-distance runners
American female marathon runners
American female steeplechase runners
American female cross country runners
Pan American Games track and field athletes for the United States
Pan American Games gold medalists for the United States
Pan American Games medalists in athletics (track and field)
Athletes (track and field) at the 2011 Pan American Games
Christians from California
Medalists at the 2011 Pan American Games
20th-century American women
21st-century American women